The 2023 FIA European Rallycross Championship will be the 48th season of the FIA European Rallycross Championship. The championship consists of two classes: RX1 and RX3.

The championship is set to begin on 29 April at the Nyirád Racing Center in Hungary, and end on 20 August at Estering in Germany.

Calendar 

On 7 December 2022, the provisional 2023 calendar was announced during the FIA World Motorsport Council decisions. A calendar update was issued on 3 March 2023.

Entries

RX1

RX3

Championship standings 
Points are scored as follows:

Notes

References

External links 

 

European Rallycross Championship seasons
European Rallycross Championship
Rallycross Championship